Endornaviridae is a family of viruses. Plants, fungi, and oomycetes serve as natural hosts. There are 31 species in this family, assigned to 2 genera (Alphaendornavirus and Betaendornavirus). Members of Alphaendornavirus infect plants, fungi and the oomycete Phytophthora sp., members of Betaendornavirus infect ascomycete fungi.

Taxonomy
The following genera are assigned to the family:
 Alphaendornavirus
 Betaendornavirus

Structure

Linear, single-stranded, positive-sense RNA genome of about 14 kb to 17.6 kb. A site specific break (nick) is found in the coding strand about 1 to 2 kb from the 5’ terminus.  ViralZone conflicts with ICTV, listing Endornaviridae as dsRNA viruses.

As the Endornaviridae genomes don't include a coat protein (CP) gene, they no true virions are associated with members of this family. For Vicia faba endornavirus, the RNA genome has been associated with some pleomorphic cytoplasmic membrane vesicles.

Life cycle
Viral replication is cytoplasmic.
The viral replicative form of the Endornaviridae is dsRNA. Replication follows the double-stranded RNA virus replication model. Double-stranded RNA virus transcription is the method of transcription.

As the replicative dsRNA form is relatively stable, it can be found in comparatively high quantities in host tissues, and therefore is a likely subject of isolations (this is the reason why Endornaviridae often are classified as dsRNA viruses, in contrast to the official ssRNA(+) ICTV classification).

The virus exits the host cell by cell to cell movement.

Plants, fungi, and oomycetes serve as the natural hosts. Transmission routes are pollen associated.

References

External links
 ICTV: ICTV Report: Endornaviridae
 SIB: Viralzone: Endornaviridae
 NCBI: Endornaviridae (family)
 Syunichi Urayama, Hiromitsu Moriyama, Nanako Aoki, Yukihiro Nakazawa, Ryo Okada, Eri Kiyota, Daisuke Miki, Ko Shimamoto, Toshiyuki Fukuhara: Knock-down of OsDCL2 in rice negatively affects maintenance of the endogenous dsRNA virus, Oryza sativa endornavirus. In: Plant Cell Physiol. 2010 Jan;51(1):58-67. doi:10.1093/pcp/pcp167. PMID 19933266. Epub 2009 Nov 19.

Double-stranded RNA viruses
Viral plant pathogens and diseases
Virus families
Riboviria